Club YLA is Club Brugge's women's section. It was founded in 2000 as the women's division of KSV Jabbeke. In 2010 they started working together with Club Brugge as it was needed to cooperate with a male club in the highest division to become part of the Elite League for women.

History
In 2012 they changed their name into Club Brugge Dames. In 2012 they joined the new BeNe League.
After the 2014/15 season the first team was disbanded.

Season 2020-21 saw renewed interest and a new competition format with the "Scooore Super League". Club Brugge KV changed its name to "Club YLA". YLA are the initials of Yvonne Lahousse(died January 12, 2006) who was one of the leading ladies of Club Bruges' fanbase from mid 1960s until her death.
Additionally, YLA is part of a new identity and branding of the women's team. Clothes and merchandising equivalent to the Club YLA look & feel is made available from the webshop.

They ended the 2020-21 regular competition in fifth place, which earned them a place in Play-off 1. These play-offs however, saw no further improvement and Club YLA finished the season in fifth.
This was the last season for Leo Van der Elst as T1, and now fulfills the role of marketing- and recruitment manager.

For season 2021-22 Dennis Moerman left his position as T2 of Gent Ladies, to become the new head coach of Club YLA.

In early April 2022, Van Der Elst announced that Club YLA will be using a period coach the next season, in an effort to reduce the possibility of injuries and / or optimise performances.

Honours 

 Belgian Women's Cup

 finalists (2x): 2013/14, 2014/15

 Belgian Women's First Division (II)

 vice-champions (1x): 2018/19

 Belgian Women's Second Division (III)

 champions (1x): 2017/18 (A-series)
 vice-champions (1x): 2016/17 (A-series)

Results

Current squad

Head coaches 
  Jean-Marie Saeremans
  Karel Gobert (2013–2013)
  Gunther Bomon (2013–2014)
  Dieter Lauwers (2014–2015)
  Leo Van der Elst (2017–2020)
  Dennis Moerman (2021~)

References & notes
Notes

External links
Official website

Women's football clubs in Belgium
Association football clubs established in 1971
1971 establishments in Belgium
BeNe League teams
Club Brugge KV
Sport in Bruges